Beaver Dam Township may refer to:

Beaver Dam Township, Butler County, Missouri
Beaver Dam Township, Cumberland County, North Carolina

Township name disambiguation pages